Omphale salicis is a species of wasp in the family Eulophidae.

References

Eulophidae
Insects described in 1833